The Deutscher Schallplattenpreis was a prize that the  awarded from 1963 through 1992. Its successor is the Echo Music Prize.

References 

German music awards
Awards established in 1963
Awards disestablished in 1992